Route 253 or Highway 253 may refer to:

Canada
 Nova Scotia Route 253
 Quebec Route 253

Costa Rica
 National Route 253

Japan
 Japan National Route 253

Korea, South
 Gochang–Damyang Expressway

United States
 Alabama State Route 253
 Arkansas Highway 253
 California State Route 253
 Georgia State Route 253
 Iowa Highway 253 (former)
 K-253 (Kansas highway)
Kentucky Route 253
 Maryland Route 253
 Minnesota State Highway 253
 Montana Secondary Highway 253
 New Mexico State Road 253
 New York State Route 253
 Ohio State Route 253
 Pennsylvania Route 253
 South Carolina Highway 253
 South Dakota Highway 253
 Tennessee State Route 253
 Texas State Highway 253 (former)
 Farm to Market Road 253 (Texas)
 Utah State Route 253 (former)
 Vermont Route 253
 Virginia State Route 253
 Wisconsin Highway 253
 Wyoming Highway 253
Territories
 Puerto Rico Highway 253